Peter de Preaux, known in his time in the Old French language as Pierre de Préaux, (died 1212) was a Norman knight in the service of the Angevin kings of England. Osbert, Peter's father, was a minor Norman baron in the Roumois (the neighborhood of Rouen, the capital of Normandy). He held the tower and ville of Preaux as well as land at Darnétal. Osbert also owned a scattering of manors in England. Peter, as the second son of the sire de Preaux, had few prospects for a landed estate. He, along with his brothers John, William, and Enguerrand were part of the royal household from a very early age. Peter would serve in succession, Henry II, Richard I, and John of England. Peter and William were known throughout the tournament circuit of the day as fierce warriors and competent knights. Sometime prior to 1189 CE, Osbert had died. John, the eldest son succeeded him to the family barony.

Crusade

Peter and William accompanied King Richard on crusade in 1190. Peter was assigned the dignity of royal standard-bearer over the hereditary standard-bearer of England, Robert Trussebut. Peter and William were known to be with the King at Vezelay, Marseille, Sicily, the conquest of Cyprus, the Siege of Acre, the Battle of Arsuf, the march to Jaffa, the advance on Jerusalem, Darum, and last but not least, the Battle of Jaffa.

After the truce had been established between Richard and Saladin, Peter was assigned an important mission with other household knights, including William des Roches and Gerard de Fournival. The crusading host had been permitted by the Muslims to complete the pilgrimage to Jerusalem. Peter, and his band, had been sent ahead of the first battalion to obtain safe conducts. According to the chronicle of the crusade attributed to Geoffrey of Vinsauf, Peter had fallen asleep at one of the villages where he was to meet a Saracen embassy. The crusaders charged ahead without receiving their safe conducts. When Peter and company had awaken, they realized that they were already behind the Christian host. Peter made all haste to catch up. He was then reprimanded by the column's commander, the king's cousin, Andrew of Chauvigny.

King Richard's last act prior to departing the Holy Land for Europe was to ransom Peter's brother, William. He had been captured by Saladin's forces a year prior while personally keeping the King from being captured. William and Peter returned to Normandy in late 1192.

France

Peter served King Richard throughout his wars against Philip II of France, 1194–1199. During the last years of Angevin rule in Normandy 1202–1204, John of England made both Peter and William important territorial military governors in Normandy. Peter was made Governor of the Channel Islands, King John granting total lordship of the islands to Peter by 1203. and William was made bailiff of the Oximin. 

By December 1203, King John left an already invaded Normandy, never to return. John of Preaux sided at this point with Philip of France. King John had left the defense of the capital with Peter as commander. His force included Henri d'Estouteville, Robert d'Esneval, Richard de Villequier, Thomas de Pavilly, Peter de Hotot and many knights of Robert, count of Alençon who did not follow their lord into his treason against King John.

By spring of 1204, Rouen was surrounded by the forces of the King of France. Normandy had been lost. Peter, in agreement with the leading men of the city, surrendered to Philip of France.

Peter then took ship to England where he was well received by King John as he brought the Channel Islands, of which he was the Governor, under the control of the English Crown.

Family
Peter was granted some of the lands of his brother John as Terra Normanorum. In addition, Peter married in 1201 Mary de Vernon, daughter of William de Vernon, 5th Earl of Devon and the Isle of Wight. Peter retired to a quiet life on his new English estates. It is believed that he died sometime in the year 1212.

See also
 List of Governors of Guernsey
 Governors or "Captains" of Jersey

References

12th-century births
1212 deaths
Norman warriors
Preux, Peter de
Christians of the Third Crusade
Preux, Peter de